The 1908 Kansas Jayhawks football team was an American football team that represented the University of Kansas as a member of the Missouri Valley Conference (MVC) during the 1908 college football season. In their fifth season under head coach A. R. Kennedy, the Jayhawks compiled a perfect 9–0 record (4–0 against conference opponents), shut out five of nine opponents, won the MVC champion, and outscored opponents by a total of 131 to 20. The season is, as of 2022, the last season the Jayhawks finished undefeated without any ties. The Jayhawks have been undefeated four other seasons but in each season they tied in at least one game.  The Jayhawks played their home games at McCook Field in Lawrence, Kansas. G. T. Crowell was the team captain.

Schedule

References

Kansas
Kansas Jayhawks football seasons
Kansas Jayhawks football
College football undefeated seasons
Missouri Valley Conference football champion seasons